, also known as Saint Seiya: Chapter Sanctuary, is a 3D action video game for the PlayStation 2 console based on the Saint Seiya manga series by Masami Kurumada. It was developed by Dimps Corporation and published by Bandai. It was originally released in Japan on April 7, 2005, and in Europe on June 30, 2005. The European release includes translations into English, Italian, French, German and Spanish.

The game features the Bronze Saints of Athena as playable characters, although others can be unlocked as the player advances in the story mode of the game. This mode allows the player to follow the storyline of the first saga of the manga, the Sanctuary saga. An alternate battle mode allows players to freely choose two characters with which to duel, both in single-player and multiplayer mode.

Gameplay
The game features a story mode, which allows the player to reenact the events of the first arc of the Saint Seiya series, the Sanctuary chapter. The player can choose to fight either on the side of the protagonists or of the antagonists. It features many CG cinematics of important scenes from the original series, as well as the opening movie from the anime. There is also a versus and a practice mode, which consist of duels that can be played either in single-player or multiplayer mode.

Development
The original Japanese version of Saint Seiya: The Sanctuary, the first 3D game developed for the PlayStation 2 inspired by the Saint Seiya series, was developed by Dimps Corporation and published by Bandai. It was released on April 7, 2005. In Europe, it was released on June 30 of the same year. The game features five immediately playable characters, the Bronze Saint protagonists of the series, and twenty-four hidden characters that play a major part in the Sanctuary arc of Saint Seiya and which can be unlocked throughout the course of the game. The European version of the game includes voice-overs in French as the default audio setting and translations into English, Italian, French, German and Spanish. It also contains alternative music tracks that differ from the Japanese version due to copyright issues. As an added incentive to the purchase of the game before it first came out, Bandai gifted Japanese players who preordered the game via the official PlayStation website with a memory card holder in the shape of the game's "most powerful item in the universe", the golden box of the Sagittarius Cloth.

Sequel

Saint Seiya: The Sanctuary has also got a sequel, with title . It has been released by Namco Bandai Games, in Japan and Europe, and on sale in 2007.

Reception

The game received "generally unfavorable reviews" according to the review aggregation website Metacritic.  In Japan, Famitsu gave it a score of one six, one five, and two sixes for a total of 23 out of 40.

References

External links
 
 

2005 video games
2007 video games
Fighting games
Saint Seiya video games
Video game sequels
Dimps games
Bandai games
Bandai Namco games
PlayStation 2 games
PlayStation 2-only games
Video games based on Greek mythology
Video games developed in Japan
Multiplayer and single-player video games